Bassel Al-Rayes (born 4 March 1979) is a Syrian-born Qatari handball player for Al Rayyan and the Qatari national team.

He participated at the 2016 Summer Olympics in Rio de Janeiro, in the men's handball tournament.

References

1979 births
Living people
Qatari male handball players
Syrian handball players
Olympic handball players of Qatar
Handball players at the 2016 Summer Olympics
Handball players at the 2006 Asian Games
Handball players at the 2010 Asian Games
Naturalised citizens of Qatar
Asian Games competitors for Qatar